Harold Joseph "Hal" McNamara (October 3, 1888 – August 27, 1937) was a Canadian professional ice hockey player, playing as a defenceman. He had two professional ice hockey playing brothers in George and Howard. Born in Randolph, Ontario he lived until 1937 before dying in Peru.

Playing career
He started as a professional with the Canadian Soo Algonquins of the International Hockey League in 1905–06. He later played for the Edmonton HC of the Alberta Amateur Hockey Association; the Toronto Pro HC and Waterloo Colts of the Ontario Professional Hockey League; and the Cobalt Silver Kings, Renfrew Creamery Kings, Toronto Ontarios and Montreal Canadiens of the National Hockey Association before retiring in 1917.

1908 Stanley Cup challenge
McNamara was one of the Edmonton Hockey Club's 'ringers' who played in an unsuccessful Stanley Cup challenge against the Montreal Wanderers in December 1908.

Later career
McNamara was hired to manage the Halifax Crescents of the Maritime Professional Hockey League for the 1913–14 season.

He died in Lima, Peru in 1937 following a brief illness. He had been engaged in construction work in the Peruvian capital city for two years prior to falling ill.

References

General

1888 births
1937 deaths
Canadian ice hockey defencemen
Cobalt Silver Kings players
Michigan Soo Indians players
Montreal Canadiens (NHA) players
Renfrew Hockey Club players
Sault Ste. Marie Marlboros players
Toronto Shamrocks players
Canadian expatriates in Peru
Canadian expatriate ice hockey players in the United States